Marginal Tietê (officially SP-015) is a section of this highway that runs through the city of São Paulo, Brazil. The name of this section comes from the fact that each way of the expressway runs near a different waterfront of the Tietê River. It is a very important road of São Paulo, connecting the East, North and West portions of the city, and linking the Lapa neighbourhood and the Penha neighbourhood. It provides access to the Castelo Branco highway, the Bandeirantes highway, the Anhangüera highway, the Presidente Dutra highway, the Fernão Dias highway, the Ayrton Senna highway and the São Paulo International Airport. The Campo de Marte Airport, the Estádio Parque São Jorge and the Estádio do Canindé are located near the freeway.

It is the site where IRL São Paulo Indy 300 race takes place.

Streets in São Paulo
Highways in São Paulo (state)